Diamonen Island is an island lying north of Moreno Rock in Gerlache Strait, off the west coast of Graham Land. It was charted by the Belgian Antarctic Expedition under Gerlache, 1897–99. The island was called "Big Diamonen Island" by Captain Skidsmo of the Graham in 1921–22. The name was shortened by the UK Antarctic Place-Names Committee in 1960.

See also 
 List of Antarctic and sub-Antarctic islands

References 

Islands of Graham Land
Danco Coast